The  Japan Series, the 58th edition of Nippon Professional Baseball's championship series, began Saturday, October 27, 2007, pitting the Pacific League Regular League and Climax Series' Champion, the Hokkaido Nippon Ham Fighters, and the Chunichi Dragons, winners of the Central League's Climax Series, in a rematch of the previous year's Japan Series, won by the Fighters. It was the first championship for the Dragons since the 1954 Japan Series, marking the end of the longest championship drought in NPB history.

In a virtual mirror image of the 2006 series, the Dragons won in the same manner that the Fighters had the previous year, losing the first game and sweeping the next four.  In one of baseball's rare situations, for the first time in a recognised international championship final since the 1956 Major League Baseball championship series, and the first one to end a series in a major professional championship, a perfect game was pitched, although recognised only by international standards and not NPB because multiple pitchers were used because NPB's definition is different from most recognised authorities. This would also be the last time a perfect game was thrown in NPB until Roki Sasaki threw a perfect game against the Orix Buffaloes on April 10, 2022.

Climax Series

Summary

Game summaries

Game 1

Game 2

Game 3

Game 4

Game 5

This was the first perfect game in Japan Series history, but only recognised as such by the global governing body of baseball, the World Baseball Softball Confederation.  NPB recognises only Complete Perfect Game or Complete Game No-hitter Shutout(also known as No-hit No-run).

See also
2007 Korean Series
2007 World Series

Japan Series
Chunichi Dragons
Hokkaido Nippon-Ham Fighters
Japan Series